Noel McCullagh (born 1975) is a journalist living in the Netherlands.

In the 2009 European Parliament elections, McCullagh stood as an independent candidate in Ireland's North-West constituency. He was not elected.

References

1975 births
Living people
21st-century Irish journalists
People from Ballinasloe
Date of birth missing (living people)